Frederick Robert Williamson (born March 5, 1938), also known as "the Hammer", is an American actor and former professional American football defensive back who played mainly in the American Football League (AFL) during the 1960s. Williamson has had a busy film career, starring as Tommy Gibbs in the 1973 crime drama film Black Caesar and its sequel Hell Up in Harlem. Williamson also had roles in other 1970s blaxploitation films such as Hammer (1972), That Man Bolt (1973) and Three the Hard Way (1974).

Early life and education
Born in Gary, Indiana, Williamson was the oldest child born to Frank, a welder and Lydia Williamson. Williamson attended Froebel High School, where he ran track and played football. He graduated in 1956. After high school, Williamson left Gary for Evanston, Illinois to attend Northwestern University on a football scholarship.

Career

Football
After playing college football for Northwestern in the late 1950s, Williamson was signed as an undrafted free agent by the Pittsburgh Steelers. When during training camp he was switched to their defense, his attitude over the switch prompted him to play his position with too much aggression, and the coach of the 49ers asked him to quit "hammering" his players. Thus, "The Hammer" quickly stuck and became his nickname.

Williamson played one year for the Steelers in the National Football League in 1960. Next, he moved to the new American Football League. Williamson played four seasons for the AFL's Oakland Raiders, making the AFL All-Star team in 1961, 1962, and 1963. He also played three seasons for the AFL's Kansas City Chiefs. During his period of playing for the Chiefs, Williamson became one of football's first self-promoters, nurturing the nickname "The Hammer" because he used his forearm to deliver karate-style blows to the heads of opposing players, especially wide receivers. Before Super Bowl I, Williamson garnered national headlines by boasting that he would knock the Green Bay Packers starting receivers, Carroll Dale and Boyd Dowler, out of the game. He stated "Two hammers to Dowler, one to Dale should be enough".

His prediction turned out to be an ironic one because "they (Green Bay) broke the hammer" as Williamson himself was knocked out of the game in the fourth quarter on the way to a 35–10 defeat. Williamson's head met the knee of the Packers' running back Donny Anderson. Williamson later suffered a broken arm from his own teammate when Chiefs linebacker Sherrill Headrick fell on him. Williamson finished his eight-season pro football career in 1967 with a history of many hard tackles, passes knocked away, and 36 pass interceptions in 104 games. Williamson returned his interceptions for 479 yards and two touchdowns. After signing with the Montreal Alouettes of the Canadian Football League during the 1968 season, but not having played in a league game, Williamson retired.

Acting

Williamson became an actor much in the mold of star running back Jim Brown. He acted alongside Brown in films such as Three the Hard Way (1974), Take a Hard Ride (1975), One Down, Two to Go (1982), Original Gangstas (1996) and On the Edge (2002). Williamson also guest starred with Brown in various television roles. In October 1973, Williamson posed nude for Playgirl magazine, preempting Brown's appearance in 1974. Williamson's early television roles included a role in the original Star Trek episode "The Cloud Minders" (1969), in which he played Anka. He also played Diahann Carroll's love interest in the sitcom Julia. In an interview for the DVD of Bronx Warriors, Williamson stated that his role in Julia was created for him when he convinced the producers that the Black community was upset that Julia had a different boyfriend every week.

Williamson's early film work included roles in M*A*S*H (1970) and Tell Me That You Love Me, Junie Moon (1970).  He portrayed an escaped slave who flees westward in The Legend of Nigger Charley (1972). He played the role of an African-American gangster in the film Black Caesar (1973) and its subsequent sequel, Hell Up in Harlem (also 1973). Williamson also starred in the 1975 western film Boss Nigger, in which he played the title role. After this he appeared as an actor in several films, most of which are considered to be of the "blaxploitation" genre. Williamson starred alongside Peter Boyle and Eli Wallach in the movie Crazy Joe (1974). In 1974, Williamson was selected by the ABC television network as a commentator on Monday Night Football to replace Don Meredith, who had left to pursue an acting and broadcasting career at rival network NBC. Williamson was used on a few pre-season broadcasts, but was quickly declared unsuitable by ABC. He was relieved of his duties at the beginning of the regular season, becoming the first MNF personality not to endure for an entire season. He was replaced by the fellow former player (and fellow Gary, Indiana, native) Alex Karras.

Williamson co-starred in the short-lived series Half Nelson (1985). During the mid-to-late 1980s and early 1990s, Williamson frequently appeared on television as a spokesman for King Cobra malt liquor ("Don't let the smooth taste fool you."), as did fellow actor/martial artist Martin Kove. In 1994, Williamson, along with many other black actors from the 'Blaxploitation' movie era (namely Antonio Fargas, Pam Grier, Rudy Ray Moore, and Ron O'Neal) made a cameo appearance on Snoop Doggy Dogg's music video "Doggy Dogg World", where he appears as himself using his pro-football nickname "The Hammer". Williamson co-starred with George Clooney and Quentin Tarantino in From Dusk till Dawn (1996), directed by Robert Rodriguez. He was in the cast of the original The Inglorious Bastards (1978), which would later inspire Tarantino's 2009 film of similar name.

Williamson has continued his career as an actor and director into the 21st Century, appearing in the reboot film Starsky & Hutch (2004) derived from the 1970s television series.

Working with clique of actors
Williamson has co-starred in a number of films with Bo Svenson. They include, The Inglorious Bastards (1978), Deadly Impact (1984),  Delta Force Commando (1987), The Kill Reflex (1989), Three Days to a Kill (1991),   and Steele's Law (1991)

Directing and producing
Since the 1970s, Williamson has had another career as a director and producer. His first film as producer was Boss Nigger (1975), in which he also starred. His second film as producer was with Mean Johnny Barrows (1976), a predecessor of the Rambo films which similarly featured a violent Vietnam Vet plot (though the novel First Blood on which the film First Blood was based was written in 1972). He has since directed over 20 features. In the middle of the 1970s, Williamson relocated to Rome, Italy and formed his own company Po' Boy Productions, which started to produce actioners including Adios Amigo (1976) and Death Journey (1976), both of which starred and were directed by Williamson. Although his most recent efforts as director and producer have mainly been direct-to-video, Williamson remains an active film maker.

Personal life
Williamson has been married twice. His first marriage was to Ginette Lavonda from 1960 until 1967. Williamson has been married to Linda Williamson since 1988. Williamson has at least three children but some sources state he has at least six. Williamson has black belts in Kenpō, Shotokan karate and taekwondo. Since 1997, Williamson has had a home in Palm Springs, California.

Filmography 

 Ironside (1968, TV series) as Det. Sgt. La Peer
 The Outsider (1969, TV series) as Randall
 Star Trek: The Original Series (1969, TV series) as Anka
 The Bold Ones: The Protectors (1969, TV series) as Arnold Bartell/Officer Williams
 M*A*S*H (1970) as Dr. Oliver 'Spearchucker' Jones
 Tell Me That You Love Me, Junie Moon (1970) as Beach Boy
 Julia (1969-1971, TV series) as Steve Bruce/Dave Boyd
 The Legend of Nigger Charley (1972) as Nigger Charley
 Hammer (1972) as B.J. Hammer
 Soul Train (1972-1974, TV series) as Guest
 Black Caesar (1973) as Tommy Gibbs
 The Soul of Nigger Charley (1973) as Charley
 Hell Up in Harlem (1973) as Tommy Gibbs
 That Man Bolt (1973) as Jefferson Bolt
 Police Story (1973-1976, TV series) as Sergeant Bunny Green/Snake McKay
 Crazy Joe (1974) as Willy
 Three Tough Guys (1974) as Joe Snake
 Black Eye (1974) as Shep Stone
 Three the Hard Way (1974) as Jagger Daniels
 The Rookies (1974, TV series) as Johnny Barrows
 Boss Nigger (1975) as Boss Nigger
 Bucktown (1975) as Duke Johnson
 Take a Hard Ride (1975) as Tyree
 Mean Johnny Barrows (1975) as Johnny Barrows
 The New Spartans (1975) as Lincoln Jefferson Washington IV
 Adios Amigo (1976) as Big Ben
 Death Journey (1976) as Jesse Crowder
 No Way Back (1976) as Jesse Crowder
 Blind Rage (1976) as Jesse Crowder
 Joshua (1976) as Joshua
 Mr. Mean (1977) as Mr. Mean
 The Inglorious Bastards (1978) as Pvt. Fred Canfield
 Wheels (1978, TV miniseries) as Leonard Wingate
 Supertrain (1979, TV series) as Al Roberts
 CHiPs (1979, TV series) as Ty
 Fantasy Island (1979, TV series) as Jackson Malone
 Fist of Fear, Touch of Death (1980, documentary) as Hammer, the ladies' man
 Lou Grant (1981, TV series) as Crusher Carter
 Fear In The City (1981) as John Dikson
 Vigilante (1982) as Nick
 1990: The Bronx Warriors (1982) as The Ogre
 One Down, Two to Go (1982) as Cal
 The New Barbarians (1982, aka Warriors of the Wasteland) as Nadir
 The Last Fight (1983) as Jesse Crowder
 The Big Score (1983) as Detective Frank Hooks
 Warrior of the Lost World (1983) as Henchman
 Warriors of the Year 2072 (1984, aka The New Gladiators) as Abdul
 Deadly Impact (1984) as Lou
 Half Nelson (1985, TV series) as Chester Long
 The Equalizer (1985, TV series) as Lt. Mason Warren
 White Fire (1985) as Noah Barclay
 Foxtrap (1986) as Thomas Fox
 The Messenger (1986) as Jake Sebastian Turner
 Black Cobra (1987) as Detective Robert Malone
 Inglorious Bastards 2: Hell's Heroes (1987) as Feather
 Delta Force Commando (1988) as Capt. Samuel Beck
 Amen (1988, TV series) as Barnet Thompson
 Taxi Killer (1988)
 Deadly Intent (1988) as Curt Slate
 Black Cobra 2 (1989) as Lt. Robert 'Bob' Malone
 The Kill Reflex (1990) as Soda Cracker
 Delta Force Commando II: Priority Red One (1990) as Captain Sam Back
 Black Cobra 3 (1990) as Lt. Robert Malone
 Black Cobra 4 (1991) as Det. Robert Malone
 Steele's Law (1991) as Lt. John Steele
 Three Days to a Kill (1992) as Cal
 State Of Mind (1992) as Loomis
 Deceptions (1992) as Brady
 South Beach (1993) as Mack Derringer
 Renegade (1994, TV series) as Jean Luc Leveaux
 Silent Hunter (1995) as Sheriff Mantee
 From Dusk till Dawn (1996) as Frost
 Original Gangstas (1996) as John Bookman
 Arliss (1996, TV series) as Fred Williamson
 Night Vision (1997) as Dakota 'Dak' Smith
 Pitch (1997, documentary) as Himself
 Fast Track (1997–1998, TV series) as Lowell Carter
 Ride (1998) as Casper's Dream Dad
 Blackjack (1998, TV movie) as Tim Hastings
 Children of the Corn V: Fields of Terror (1998) as Sheriff Skaggs
 Psi Factor (1998, TV series) as Fred Milton Di genova/Fred Milton Di Genova
 Whatever It Takes (1998) as Paulie Salano
 Active Stealth (2000) as Capt. Reynolds
 Submerged (2000) as Captain Masters
 Down 'n Dirty (2000) as Dakota Smith
 The Jamie Foxx Show (2000, TV series) as Himself
 The Independent (2000) as Himself
 Deadly Rhapsody (2001) as Jake
 Carmen: A Hip Hopera (2001, TV movie) as Lou
 Shadow Fury (2001) as Sam
 The Rage Within (2001) as Dakota Smith
 On the Edge (2002) as Dakota Smith
 Sexual Preadator Alert (2002, TV series) as Host
 Starsky & Hutch (2004) as Captain Doby
 If Love Hadn't Left Me Lonely (2004) as Willie Brownlee Davis
 Ned's Declassified School Survival Guide (2005, TV series) as Coach Stax
 Transformed (2005) as The Hammer
 Spaced Out (2006) as The Hammer
 Crooked (2006) as Jack Paxton
 Vegas Vampires (2007) as Fred Pittman
 Fighting Words (2007) as Gabriel
 Revamped (2007) as Captain Michaels
 Hello Paradise (2007-2008, TV series)
 Knight Rider (2009, TV series) as DEA Director
 Pushing Daisies (2009, TV series) as Roland 'Rollie' Stingwell
 Shoot the Hero! (2010) as The General
 Street Poet (2010) as Gabriel
 Zombie Apocalypse: Redemption (2010) as Moses
 The Voices from Beyond (2012) as Agent Farley
 Last Ounce of Courage (2012) as Warren Hammerschmidt
 Dropping Evil (2012) as Commander Death Blood
 Comedy Bang! Bang! (2012-2015, TV series) as Chief/Dale's Boss
 .357 (2013) as Hammer
 Billy Trigger (2014) as Pops
 Real Husbands of Hollywood (2014-2016, TV series) as Jet Black
 Atomic Eden (2015) as Stoker - The Leader
 Check Point (2017) as Chester
 Being Mary Jane (2017, TV series) as Frank Pearl
 A Chance in the World (2017) as Charlie
 Unkillable (2018) as Master Lee
 Jackson Bolt (2018) as Tommy
 A Stone Cold Christmas (2018) as Mark Kurt
 Bodyguard Wars (2019)
 VFW (2019) as Abe Hawkins 
 Devil's Triangle (2021) as Pluto

See also 
 List of American Football League players

References

External links 

 
 

1938 births
African-American film directors
African-American male actors
American football cornerbacks
American Football League All-Star players
American male film actors
Film directors from Indiana
Kansas City Chiefs players
Living people
Male actors from Indiana
Male actors from Palm Springs, California
Male Spaghetti Western actors
National Football League announcers
Northwestern Wildcats football players
Oakland Raiders players
People with lupus
Playgirl Men of the Month
Sportspeople from Palm Springs, California
American Football League players
Northwestern University alumni
African-American architects
Players of American football from Gary, Indiana
Actors from Gary, Indiana
Film directors from California
21st-century African-American people
20th-century African-American people
Pittsburgh Steelers players